Bukhansan Ui Station is a station on the Ui LRT located in Ui-dong, Gangbuk-gu, Seoul. It opened on the 2 September 2017. The tracks continue through the station to the Train Depot. The station is located next to the Ui LRT Control centre.

Station layout

Vicinity

Exit 1 : Ui Amusement Park, Ganbuk-gu Towed Vehicles Storage Office, Ui-dong Food Village
Exit 2 : Ui-dong Meeting Plaza, To Doseonsa Temple

References

Seoul Metropolitan Subway stations
Railway stations opened in 2017
Metro stations in Gangbuk District
2017 establishments in South Korea